The smallfish snake eel (Quassiremus nothochir, also known as the redsaddled snake eel in Mexico) is an eel in the family Ophichthidae (worm/snake eels). It was described by Charles Henry Gilbert in 1890. It is a marine, tropical eel which is known from the eastern central Pacific Ocean, including Mexico, Nicaragua, Panama, the Gulf of California and Costa Rica.

Due to its wide distribution in its region, its lack of known threats and lack of observed population decline, the IUCN redlist currently lists the Smallfish snake-eel as Least Concern.

References

External links
 

Ophichthidae
Fish described in 1890